Catocala micronympha, the little nymph underwing or little bride underwing, is a moth of the family Erebidae. The species was first described by Achille Guenée in 1852. It is found in North America from southern Ontario, Quebec, and Manitoba through New Hampshire, Connecticut, and New Jersey to Florida, west to Texas and then north through Oklahoma, Kansas, Iowa, to Wisconsin and Minnesota and then east to Michigan.

The wingspan is 35–50 mm. Adults are on wing from April to September depending on the location. There is probably one generation per year.

The larvae feed on Quercus macrocarpa, Quercus stellata, and Quercus virginiana

References

External links
Species info

micronympha
Moths of North America
Moths described in 1852